Geiranger is a small tourist village in Sunnmøre region of Møre og Romsdal county in the western part of Norway. It is in the municipality of Stranda at the head of the Geirangerfjorden, which is a branch of the large Storfjorden. The nearest city is Ålesund. Geiranger is home to spectacular scenery, and has been named the best travel destination in Scandinavia by Lonely Planet. Since 2005, the Geirangerfjord area has been listed as a UNESCO World Heritage Site.  The Seven Sisters waterfall is located just west of Geiranger, directly across another waterfall called "The Suitor."  Norwegian County Road 63 passes through the village.  Geiranger Church is the main church for the village and surrounding area.

Geiranger is under constant threat from landslides from the mountain Åkerneset into the fjord. A collapse would cause a tsunami that could destroy downtown Geiranger. For this reason, sirens have been installed to warn residents if a landslide should occur.

Name
The suffix -angr ('fjord') is a common element in Norwegian place names (see for instance Hardanger and Varanger). The first element could be the plural genitive of the Norse word geiri ('piece of land; field in a mountain side') which is related to English gore ('spear-shaped piece of land'). This would then refer to the several small farms and fields lying in the steep mountain sides around the fjord. (See Knivsflå and Skageflå.)

Tourism
This third biggest cruise ship port in Norway, Geiranger receives 140 to 180 ships during the four-month tourist season. In 2012 some 300,000 cruise passengers visited Geiranger during the summer season. The Geiranger Port has a cruise terminal, a Seawalk, and 3–4 anchor positions depending on the size of the ships. Constructed in 2013, the Seawalk is a three-segment articulated floating pier.

Several hundred thousand people pass through the village every summer, and tourism is the main business for the 250 people who live there permanently. There are five hotels and over ten camping sites. The tourist season stretches from May to early September. Tours of the nearby historic farms of Knivsflå and Skageflå are available from Geiranger.

Each year in June, the Geiranger – From Fjord to Summit event occurs. It comprises a half marathon run and a bicycle race, both starting from the sea level at the fjord and ending at the  summit of Mount Dalsnibba, near the lake Djupvatnet. Since there is still a lot of snow left in the mountains at that time of year, the race is also called "From Summer to Winter".

Media gallery

In popular culture 
 Released in August 2015, The Wave (Bølgen) is a Norwegian disaster movie based on the premise of a rock slide from the mountain Åkerneset inundating the town of Geiranger. A sequel,The Quake (Skjelvet) was released in 2018.

References

External links

 geiranger.no
 Geiranger Fjord—David Cartagena print
 Destinasjon Geirangerfjord—Trollstigen
 Image from Geiranger
 Geiranger—From Fjord to Summit
 UNESCO World Heritage
 Geiranger in 360 degree VR panorama

Stranda
Villages in Møre og Romsdal